The Bailey V5 is a British paramotor, designed and produced by Bailey Aviation of Royston, Hertfordshire for powered paragliding. The aircraft is supplied complete and ready-to-fly.

Design and development
The aircraft was designed to comply with the US FAR 103 Ultralight Vehicles rules as well as European regulations. It features a paraglider-style wing, single-place accommodation and a single  Bailey V5 engine in pusher configuration with a 3.2:1 ratio belt reduction drive and a  diameter Helix Carbon GmbH two-bladed carbon fibre propeller. The aircraft is built from TIG welded aluminium tubing, with the propeller safety cage made from a single hoop and is a four-piece split type design. The pilot harness was designed by Bailey Aviation and Sup’Air of France. A variety of paraglider wings can be used.

As is the case with all paramotors, take-off and landing is accomplished by foot. Inflight steering is accomplished via handles that actuate the canopy brakes, creating roll and yaw.

Specifications (V5)

References

External links

V5
2010s British ultralight aircraft
Single-engine aircraft
Paramotors